Erica Cerra (born October 31, 1979) is a Canadian actress, best known for her portrayal of Deputy Jo Lupo on the Syfy series Eureka, and artificial intelligence A.L.I.E. and her creator Becca on The 100.

Career
Cerra was born in Vancouver, British Columbia, of Italian descent. Captivated by acting from an early age, she first appeared in the Canadian show KidZone then in numerous commercials as a child. She then took a break from acting, because, in her own words; "it was about wanting to be 14....I wanted to be 14 with no responsibility but I always wanted to act again."

Between 2001 and 2006, Cerra had guest roles on several popular and critically acclaimed TV shows including Battlestar Galactica, The L Word and Smallville. Her other roles included parts in  The 4400, The Dead Zone, Reaper, Huff and Dead Like Me, as well as the Canadian police procedural Cold Squad, the monster-hunting action series Special Unit 2, and the supernatural thriller series The Collector. She also appeared in major cinematic movie releases Man About Town with Ben Affleck and Rebecca Romijn, and Blade:Trinity with Wesley Snipes.

In 2006, she starred in the music video for the Michael Bublé song "Save the Last Dance for Me". That year also saw her land her most successful role to date, when she was cast as Deputy Jo Lupo in Eureka, a Syfy series which was broadcast between 2006 and 2012.  Cerra was one of the stars of the ensemble cast, with her character playing an integral role throughout the series' five seasons.

She has since appeared in various guest roles in series such as Warehouse 13, Sanctuary, Supernatural and Motive. She had a recurring role in the 2014 USA Network series Rush and appeared in the CW series iZombie in 2015.

Erica appeared in the second season finale of the CW series The 100 which aired on March 11, 2015, as a mysterious A.I. called A.L.I.E. She played the main antagonist during the third season and reprised the role in an episode of the fourth season. Cerra also played Becca, the creator of A.L.I.E., in a flashback storyline.

Personal life
Cerra married Raffaele Fiore in November 2010. Cerra gave birth to the couple's first child, a daughter, in May 2012.

Filmography

Film

Television

Web

References

External links 

 
 
 
 Erica Cerra Gallery

1979 births
Actresses from Vancouver
Canadian film actresses
Canadian people of Italian descent
Canadian television actresses
Living people
21st-century Canadian actresses